Peridexia is a genus of beetles in the family Cicindelidae, containing the following species:

 Peridexia fulvipes (Dejean, 1831)
 Peridexia hilaris (Fairmaire, 1883)

References 
Moravec J. 2010: Tiger beetles of the Madagascan Region (Madagascar, Seychelles, Comoros, Mascarenes, and other islands). Taxonomic revision of the 17 genera occurring in the region (Coleoptera: Cicindelidae). Biosférická rezernace Folní Morava 429 pp.

Cicindelidae